Together is a 2022 Czech psychological drama film starring Štěpán Kozub. It is a film adaptation of a psychological drama about life with autism; it is based on a play by the French actor and playwright Fabio Marra. It was written and directed by David Laňka and Martin Müller. The film was presented on July 7, 2022, at the 56th Karlovy Vary International Film Festival.

Cast
 Štěpán Kozub as Michal
 Veronika Žilková as Ivana
 Kamila Janovičová as Tereza
 Marek Němec as Marek
 Kristýna Podzimková as a nurse
 Martina Babišová as a miss
 Václav Kopta as Špaček
 Marianna Polyaková

References

External links
 

2022 films
2022 drama films
Czech drama films
2020s Czech-language films
Czech psychological drama films
Films about autism